= Judyta Jakubowiczowa =

Polish-Jewish merchant and banker

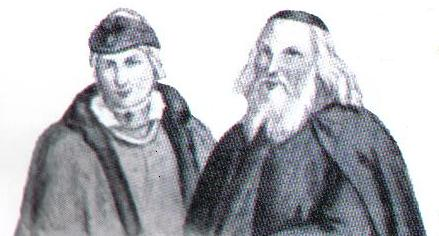

Judyta Jakubowiczowa also called Zarówkaer and Sonnenberg (1751–1829) was a Polish-Jewish merchant and banker.

Judyta Jakubowiczowa married in 1770 to the rich Jewish merchant-banker Samuel Zbytkower, purveyor to the Polish king. She served as negotiator for her famously wealthy spouse. After his death in 1801, she continued his business alone. During the period of the Duchy of Warsaw, she was the largest purveyor to the Polish and French armies.
